This is a list of members of the Victorian Legislative Council at the election of 1 June 1916 up to the election of 5 June 1919. As half of the Legislative Council's terms expired at each triennial election, half of these members were elected at the 1913 triennial election with terms expiring in 1919, while the other half were elected at the 1916 triennial election with terms expiring in 1922.

The Electoral Provinces Boundaries Act 1903 defined 17 Provinces with two members each for a total of 34 members.

Note the "Term in Office" refers to that members term(s) in the Council, not necessarily for that Province.

John Mark Davies was President; Arthur Sachse was Chairman of Committees.

 Aikman was defeated by Daniel McNamara at the 1916 elections, but McNamara was found to be ineligible and Aikman was returned to the seat.
 R. Beckett died 2 June 1917; replaced by William Edgar in July 1917.
 McDonald left the Council in January 1917; replaced by Alexander Bell in March 1917.
 McLellan resigned April 1917; replaced by Daniel McNamara in May 1917.
 Melville died 20 March 1919; replaced by Esmond Kiernan in June 1919.
 Pearson left the Council in October 1916; replaced by George Martley Davis in January 1917.

References

 Re-member (a database of all Victorian MPs since 1851). Parliament of Victoria.

Members of the Parliament of Victoria by term
20th-century Australian politicians